West Ukrainian University of Economics and Law is a Ukrainian University in Ivano-Frankivsk.

History
The university started its activities in Bukovina in 1991 as a Ukrainian Free Institute of Management and Business (UVIMB). From 1995 as Czernowitz School of Economics and Law (Economics and Law Institute in Chernivtsi).

The university was re-registered in 2003 on the basis Ivano-Frankivsk Faculty of Law and Business Economics, which was acted as a structural unit of Czernowitz School of Economics and Law from 1992. It is now Czernowitz School of Economics and Law is detached structural divisions of the university.

Institutes and faculties
2 Faculties function in the structure of the university.

Faculty of Economics
Faculty of Law

References
 www.jobs.ua
 www.osvita.org.ua

Universities in Ukraine
Education in Ivano-Frankivsk
Law schools